Gunnel Johansson (12 August 1922 – 7 May 2013) was a Swedish artistic gymnast who competed in the 1948 Summer Olympics.

References

1922 births
2013 deaths
Swedish female artistic gymnasts
Olympic gymnasts of Sweden
Gymnasts at the 1948 Summer Olympics